Hasim Đoković (Cyrillic: Хасим Ђоковић, born 20 May 1978) is a retired Montenegrin footballer who played professionally in Montenegro, Serbia, Italy, Albania and Bosnia.

He is also coaching the youth teams at FK Dečić.

Club career
He represented many teams, including Italian Reggina Calcio, Serbian FK Borac Čačak, Bosnian FK Željezničar Sarajevo, Montenegrin FK Budućnost Podgorica, but his best period was while playing in Albanian Superliga club KS Vllaznia Shkodër where he won the 2000/01 Championship and Supercup, and was proclaimed the best foreign player and the best midfielder of that season by the Albanian Football Federation.

References

External sources
 Career story at Legends in FK Dečić official website.

1978 births
Living people
People from Tuzi
Association football midfielders
Serbia and Montenegro footballers
Montenegrin footballers
FK Dečić players
OFK Titograd players
FK Borac Čačak players
FK Budućnost Podgorica players
KF Vllaznia Shkodër players
Reggina 1914 players
FK Željezničar Sarajevo players
Second League of Serbia and Montenegro players
First League of Serbia and Montenegro players
Kategoria Superiore players
Premier League of Bosnia and Herzegovina players
Montenegrin First League players
Serbia and Montenegro expatriate footballers
Expatriate footballers in Albania
Serbia and Montenegro expatriate sportspeople in Albania
Expatriate footballers in Italy
Serbia and Montenegro expatriate sportspeople in Italy
Expatriate footballers in Bosnia and Herzegovina
Serbia and Montenegro expatriate sportspeople in Bosnia and Herzegovina